Hidekatsu Ishida (1908 – February 1945) was a Japanese diver. He competed in the men's 10 metre platform event at the 1932 Summer Olympics.

References

External links
 

1908 births
1945 deaths
Japanese male divers
Olympic divers of Japan
Divers at the 1932 Summer Olympics
Place of birth missing
Imperial Japanese Army personnel of World War II
Japanese military personnel killed in World War II
20th-century Japanese people